Swami Omanand Saraswati (1911, – 23 March 2003) was an educator and collector of ancient artifacts in Haryana, India. He was  born in March 1910 in Narela, near Delhi, and died at Delhi on 23 March 2003 at the age of 93.

Saraswati was director of the archaeological museum at Jhajjar, to the collections of which he made significant accessions from all over India. He was also a member of the Arya Samaj.

See also

 Arya Samajis
 Hindu reformists

References 

Omanand Sarswati, Swami
Omanand Sarswati, Swami
People from Jhajjar
Arya Samajis